Saladin Schmitt (18 September 1883 – 14 March 1951), real name Joseph Anton Schmitt, also active under the pseudonym Harald Hoffmann) was a German theatre director.

Life 
Born in Bingen am Rhein, Schmitt came from a family of wine merchants and mill owners who had lived on the lower Nahe for several generations. The eldest son was always called Saladin because, according to family legend, an ancestor had taken part in the Crusades. When his elder brother Saladin died, he took his first name.

After graduating from high school in Darmstadt in 1901, he studied German in Bonn and Berlin. In 1905, he received his doctorate from the Bonn Germanist and theatre scholar Berthold Litzmann with a thesis on Friedrich Hebbel. In addition to his studies, he took lessons as an actor and director under the pseudonym Harald Hoffmann at the Cologne Drama School under Max Martersteig as an actor and director.

From 1913 to 1915, he was play director at the Stadttheater Freiburg, and during the First World War he directed the Deutsches Theater in Brussels.

From 1919 to 1949, Schmitt was the artistic director of the Schauspielhaus Bochum and from 1921 to 1935 also of the Deutsche Oper am Rhein. In Bochum, he established the reputation of the theatre with plays by Friedrich Schiller, William Shakespeare and other classical authors, but also with works of the younger generation, such as Heinrich Eduard Jacob, whose play Beaumarchais and Sonnenfels he successfully staged on 6 December 1919.

From 1937 he was vice-president and from 1943 president of the Deutsche Shakespeare-Gesellschaft.

Schmitt's homosexuality is first documented in his letters to Ernst Bertram, whom he met during their time studying together in Bonn. Their relationship ended when Bertram became firmly attached to Ernst Glöckner. Saladin Schmitt was open about his disposition. He knew numerous homosexuals and consorted with them. During the short engagement as head director in Freiburg he got into "considerable trouble" because of this.

Schmitt was a third cousin of Stefan George. A complete collection of the surviving poems as well as Schmitt's letters to George was published in 1964 by Robert Boehringer from George's estate. The following stanza from George's poem  refers to Schmitt.

References

Further reading 
 Saladin Schmitt: , Dortmund 1906
 Stadt Bochum (ed.): Saladin Schmitt. Blätter der Erinnerung., Bochum 1964
 Saladin Schmitt: Die so gegangen sind. Seine Gedichte und sein Verhältnis zu Stefan George. Edited by Robert Boehringer, Düsseldorf, Munich 1964
 Hermann Beil: Saladin Schmitt – Der Theatergründer (Buch zu einer Ausstellung im Schauspielhaus Bochum 1983/1984)
 Uwe-K. Ketelsen: Ein Theater und seine Stadt. Die Geschichte des Bochumer Schauspielhauses, Cologne 1999 
 Jessica Pesch: Festspiele für ein neues Deutschland? Saladin Schmitts Klassikerwochen am Schauspielhaus Bochum im Dritten Reich, Herne 1999

External links 
 
 Short biography
 Saladin Schmitt on 
 Porträt von Saladin Schmitt auf der Homepage der Stadt Bochum (online)

German theatre directors
1883 births
1951 deaths
People from Bingen am Rhein